Two vessels of the British Royal Navy have been named HMS Serene:

  was an S-class destroyer launched in 1918 and scrapped in 1939
  was an  launched in 1943 and scrapped in 1959

Royal Navy ship names